The 2004 United States House of Representatives election in Montana were held on November 2, 2004 to determine who will represent the state of Montana in the United States House of Representatives. Montana has one, at large district in the House, apportioned according to the 2000 United States Census, due to its low population. Representatives are elected for two-year terms.

General Election

Results

References 

2004 Montana elections
Montana
2004